Pulford was a short-lived minor railway station located on the Great Western Railway's Paddington to Birkenhead line several miles south of Chester, just inside the English border. The route is still open today as part of the Shrewsbury to Chester Line. Nothing now remains at the site except for a Pulford AHB level crossing. The double track on the Wrexham to Chester section was singled in 1983 but was redoubled through here in 2017 as part of a £40 million upgrade of the route.

References

Neighbouring stations

External links
 Pulford Siding on navigable 1946 O.S. map (station long gone)

Disused railway stations in Cheshire
Former Great Western Railway stations
Railway stations in Great Britain opened in 1846
Railway stations in Great Britain closed in 1855
1846 establishments in England